Roundabout (which debuted as Morning Magazine) is an Australian morning television program which aired from 1967 to 1971, when it was replaced with/became The Roy Hampson Show.  It aired in Melbourne on what was then station ATV-0 (now ATV-10 and part of Network Ten). It evolved out of an earlier series called Chit-Chat.

It consisted of various segments and was a daytime talk show for women. Hosts of the series included Katrina Pye and Roy Hampson.

References

External links
 

Network 10 original programming
1967 Australian television series debuts
1971 Australian television series endings
Australian television talk shows
Black-and-white Australian television shows
English-language television shows